Majid, Majed (also: Maajed or Maged or Magid) is a masculine Arabic given name, which may also appear as the surname Majid.

Origin and spelling
The name Majid or Majed in Arabic means Noble or Glorious or Magnificent, and can also mean Honor or Generosity. In general, Majid in Arabic is something abundant.

In English, it can be spelled Majid or Majed. The name Majid is often mistakenly confused with Majeed, which is a different name.

Variant spellings
 In Arabic:  (Majid), (Majdddd), (Magid)
 In English: Majed, Majid, Maajed
 In Turkish: Macit, Majid
 In Ottoman Turkish:  (Majed)
 In Persian:  (Majed),  (Majid)
 In Russian: Маджид (Madzhid) or (Majed)
 In Bashkir: Мәжит (Majit)
 In Janalif: Məƶit
 In French: Madjid, Majid
 In German: Majid or Madschid 
 In Korean: 마지드 (Majideu)
 In Japanese: マジッド (Majiddo)
 In Chinese: 马吉德 (Mǎjídé)
 In Spanish: Majid
 In Hebrew: מג'יד (Majid)
 In Italian: Majid

People
 Majid Arslan (1908—1983), Lebanese politician
 Majid Jordan, Canadian R&B duo
 Majid bin Abdulaziz Al Saud (1938–2003), Saudi royal

See also
Majid (disambiguation)

Arabic masculine given names
Turkish masculine given names